Tennessee elected its members August 5–6, 1819, after the new congress began but before the first session convened.

See also 
 1818 and 1819 United States House of Representatives elections
 List of United States representatives from Tennessee

1819
Tennessee
United States House of Representatives